Purab Kohli is an Indian television and film actor, model and former video jockey.

Career

Television
Kohli started his career as an actor with the 1998 television show Hip Hip Hurray on Zee TV and earned recognition through video jockeying on Channel V. He then hosted the travel show Gone India where he toured India on budget trips.

In 2005, he appeared in an episode of the TV fantasy sitcom Shararat, as the genius science student Dhumketu.

In 2010 he anchored the Zee TV music talent hunt Sa Re Ga Ma Pa Singing Superstar. In 2013, he hosted the show Terra Quiz on National Geographic Channel.

He has also featured in television ads for Colgate, Pizza Hut, Compaq Presario, Amaron Batteries and Castrol.

In 2014, he became one of the contestants in season 7 of the reality TV show Jhalak Dikhhla Jaa.

Kohli had a key supporting role in Sense8 a series on Netflix by The Wachowskis with the finale premiering in June 2018.

Films
Kohli made his acting debut in films with Bus Yuhin (2003) starring opposite Nandita Das. He has also acted in other films like Supari (2003), Vastu Shastra (2004), and 13th Floor (2005). His performance in My Brother Nikhil (2005) got him recognition. Kohli then went on to star in Mahesh Bhatt's 2006 film Woh Lamhe and as a villain again in Bhatt's 2007 film Awarapan. He also acted in Rock On!! (2008) along with Farhan Akhtar, Luke Kenny and Arjun Rampal. Kohli's work in Rock On garnered him a Special Jury Mention at the 2009 Filmfare Awards in March 2009. Kohli then starred opposite Nandita Das again in the 2010-11 film I Am which was directed by Onir, who had previously directed him in My Brother Nikhil. He also contributed financially in the making of this film. Purab played the role of a divorced lawyer in the 2012 movie Kuch Spice To Make It Meetha with actress Nauheed Cyrusi and composer Kavish Mishra. Purab's 2014 movie Jal is a story based on villagers' fight for water and dignity.

Web series
Purab Kohli appeared as Angad Shergil in the Voot web series It's Not That Simple (2018), with other featured cast Swara Bhaskar, Sumeet Vyas, Vivan Bhatena, Manasi Rachh, Neha Chauhan, Karan Veer Mehra, Devika Vatsa, Rohan Shah, Jia Vaidya.

In 2019, Kohli was cast in Sujoy Ghosh directed webseries Typewriter, which streamed on Netflix in July.

In another immensely watchable Hotstar web series of 2019 Out of Love Purab plays Akarsh, in a five-episode series of betrayal, heartbreak, blackmail and revenge, with other cast Rasika Dugal, Soni Razdan.

Personal life
Kohli's father Harsh is a hotelier and film producer and his mother is a corporate trainer. He did his schooling at St. Stanislaus High School in Bandra, Mumbai, and at The Bishop's School, Pune, Maharashtra. He switched his education faculty from Science to Commerce and finally to Arts and studied Economics, Psychology and Literature. He joined a flying school to be a pilot, but did not continue.

Kohli married his long time girlfriend Lucy Payton in a private ceremony in Goa on 15 February 2018. The couple has a daughter Inaya (b. 2015).

Former actor Bhisham Kohli a.k.a. Vishal Anand is his paternal uncle (father's brother). Kohli's paternal grandmother was Dev Anand's sister (thus making Kohli the late actor's grand-nephew). Filmmaker Shekhar Kapur (son of another of Dev Anand's sisters) is thus, Kohli's uncle.

Filmography

References

External links
 
 Purab-Kohli at exploto

Indian male models
Living people
21st-century Indian male actors
Male actors in Hindi cinema
Indian VJs (media personalities)
1979 births
Punjabi people
Filmfare Awards winners